R. and W. Scott Ice Company Powerhouse and Ice House Site is a national historic district located at Stuyvesant in Columbia County, New York.  The district includes one contributing building, one contributing structure, and one contributing site.  They are the remains of an ice house, the exterior walls and chimney of a powerhouse (ca. 1885) and the surviving features of a dock and bulkhead.  The ice house measured 300 feet long and 200 feet wide and the foundation walls are two feet thick.

It was listed on the National Register of Historic Places in 1985.

See also
 List of ice companies

References

Historic districts on the National Register of Historic Places in New York (state)
Industrial buildings and structures on the National Register of Historic Places in New York (state)
Infrastructure completed in 1885
Historic districts in Columbia County, New York
Ice companies
National Register of Historic Places in Columbia County, New York